(also written as Yuuji Horii; born January 6, 1954) is a Japanese video game designer and scenario writer best known as the creator of the Dragon Quest series of role-playing games, supervising and writing the scenario for Chrono Trigger, as well as one of the first visual novel adventure games Portopia Serial Murder Case.

History 
Horii was born on January 6, 1954, in Awaji Island, Japan. He graduated from Waseda University's Department of Literature. He also worked as a freelance writer for newspapers, comics, and magazines, including the Famicom Shinken video games column that ran in Weekly Shōnen Jump from 1985 to 1988.

He then entered in an Enix-sponsored game programming contest, where he placed with Love Match Tennis, a tennis video game, motivating him to become a video game designer.

Horii then created The Portopia Serial Murder Case by himself, a game that later inspired Hideo Kojima (of Metal Gear fame) to enter the video game industry. It is the first part of the Yuuji Horii Mysteries trilogy, along with its successors Okhotsk ni Kiyu: Hokkaido Rensa Satsujin (1984) and Karuizawa Yūkai Annai (1985).

After creating several more visual novel adventure games, Horii went on to create Dragon Quest, which is said to have created the blueprint for Japanese console role-playing games, taking inspiration from Portopia, as well as Wizardry and Ultima.

He was a fan of Apple PC role-playing games and was motivated to create Dragon Quest for ordinary gamers, who found such games difficult, and thus he worked on an intuitive control system, influenced by his work on Portopia.

His works also include the Itadaki Street series. Horii was also a supervisor of the Super Nintendo Entertainment System game, Chrono Trigger, which had multiple game endings, with Horii appearing in one of the endings with the game development staff.

Horii currently heads his own production company, Armor Project, a company that has an exclusive production contract with Square Enix, a contract established with Enix before the company merged with Square. He is on the selection committee for the annual Super Dash Novel Rookie of the Year Award.

Works

Awards 
In 2009, Horii received a special award at Computer Entertainment Supplier's Association Developers Conference for his work on the Dragon Quest franchise. Horii received a lifetime achievement award at the 2022 Game Developers Conference for his work on Dragon Quest and Chrono Trigger.

References

External links 

1954 births
Japanese video game designers
Japanese video game directors
Video game writers
Living people
Dragon Quest
People from Hyōgo Prefecture
Waseda University alumni